Duisburg-Ruhrort is a railway station in Duisburg, North Rhine-Westphalia, Germany.

The station
The station is located on the Oberhausen–Duisburg-Ruhrort railway and is served by RB services operated by NordWestBahn.

Train services
The following services currently call at Duisburg-Ruhrort:

Tram and bus services
The road in front of the station is also used by tram line 901, which stops directly at the station as well as at the station Friedrichsplatz, which is located in walking distance south of the station. Local bus lines 907 and 909 also stop in front of the station. At Friedrichsplatz, lines 911, 925 and 929 stop.

References

Railway stations in North Rhine-Westphalia
Buildings and structures in Duisburg
Transport in Duisburg